Magalenha is a song by Brazilian musician Carlinhos Brown. It is the second track on studio album Brasileiro (1992). The song was produced by Brown and Mendes as executive producer and written by Brown. The song was included on Brown's studio album Mixturada Brasileira (2012). The single appears in the 1998 film Dance with Me and its soundtrack.

Cuban-American singer Gloria Estefan covered this song on her album Brazil305 in 2020. The song features Brown.

Track listing 

7" - Spain
A1. "Magalenha" - 3:37
B1. "Magalenha" - 3:37

12" - Japan
A1. "Magalenha" (Moto Blanco Main Remix) - 7:43
A2. "Magalenha" (Moto Blanco Dub Remix) - 7:44
A3. "Magalenha" (Album Version) - 3:56
B1. "Emorio" (Paul Oakenfold Club Mix) - 4:58
B2. "Maracatu Atômico" (Paul Oakenfold Club Mix) - 5:09

12" - United Kingdom
A1. "Magalenha" (Moto Blanco Main Remix) - 7:43
A2. "Magalenha" (Moto Blanco Dub Remix) - 7:44
B1. "Magalenha" (Moto Blanco Radio Edit)

CD single - Bellini & Mendonça Do Rio remixes
 "Magalenha" (Radio Mix) - 3:16
 "Magalenha" (Extended Mix) - 6:04
 "Magalenha" (Bongoloverz Mix) - 7:53
 "Magalenha" (Original Edit) - 3:35

EP download digital - Mendonça Do Rio remixes
 "Magalenha 2012" (Tiko's Groove Radio Edit) - 3:16 
 "Magalenha 2012" (Tiko's Groove Extended Mix) - 5:38
 "Magalenha 2012" (Joe K Radio Edit) - 3:34
 "Magalenha 2012" (Joe K Extended Mix) - 6:25

References

1992 singles
2012 singles
Brazilian songs
Elektra Records singles
Portuguese-language songs
Sérgio Mendes songs